Star Fox is a series of spaceship shooter games published by Nintendo. The main protagonist and player character of the series is Fox McCloud, the leader of a team of anthropomorphic animals in the Lylat planetary system called Star Fox. Gameplay involves control of futuristic aircraft called Arwings, as well as other vehicles and combat on foot.

According to programmer Dylan Cuthbert, several names of animals were used in the names of the characters whenever the development team believed they, for those characters, "[sounded] good".

Overview

Star Fox

 or Team Star Fox, is a band of adventurers-for-hire often employed by General Pepper. The team is headed by Fox McCloud. Star Fox 64 fills in the background of the team where at its founding, it was composed of James McCloud, Peppy Hare, and Pigma Dengar (who later betrays the team and sides with Andross). Peppy later retires from active flight duty shortly before Star Fox: Assault and was more or less replaced by Krystal, Fox's love interest. The team's primary aircraft is the Arwing, their land craft is the Landmaster, and the team's mothership is known as the Great Fox. The team is made up of Fox McCloud, Falco Lombardi, Krystal, Slippy Toad, and Peppy Hare.

Fox McCloud

 is a red fox, the main character of the series, the leader of the team and James McCloud's son. Fox wears a green suit. When he hears about his father's disappearance, he drops out of the Corneria Defense Force. At the start of the series, Fox is young and still training under Peppy Hare, his father's friend and wingmate. He becomes an expert pilot, skilled in both air and ground-based attacking, as seen in Star Fox: Assault. Fox begins a relationship with Krystal in Star Fox Adventures which continues through Star Fox: Assault and possibly ends in Star Fox: Command when Fox forces her off the team for fear of her safety, though the outcome can change depending on the route and ending.

Fox is also a playable character in all five games in the Super Smash Bros. series.

The character is voiced in English by Steve Malpass in Star Fox Adventures, Jim Walker in Star Fox: Assault, and Mike West in Starlink: Battle for Atlas and Super Smash Bros. Ultimate. In the Japanese versions, he is voiced by Shinobu Satouchi in Star Fox 64, Super Smash Bros., and Super Smash Bros. Melee, Kenji Nojima in Star Fox: Assault and Super Smash Bros. Brawl, Super Smash Bros. for Nintendo 3DS and Wii U and by Takashi Ohara from Star Fox 64 3D onwards.

Falco Lombardi

 is an ace pilot and one of Fox's friends. Falco wears an orange suit and resembles both raptors and pheasants. He shares his first name, with the genus of falcons and kestrels. Falco is voiced in English by Ben Cullum in Star Fox Adventures and Mike Madeoy in Star Fox: Assault. He is voiced by Hisao Egawa in most Japanese releases of the series and by Kōsuke Takaguchi in Star Fox 64 3D onwards.

Falco joins and leaves the Star Fox team throughout the series of games. He is seen as a partner to Fox as they are very close. After Star Fox 64, Falco leaves the team for a time, going solo. His absence from the team is chronicled in the Nintendo manga Star Fox: Farewell, Beloved Falco, which was released on the official Star Fox Adventures Japanese website. He returns at the end of Star Fox Adventures.

Falco has also appeared in Super Smash Bros. Melee, Super Smash Bros. Brawl, Super Smash Bros. for Nintendo 3DS and Wii U, and Super Smash Bros. Ultimate as a playable character.

Slippy Toad

 is a toad who wears a blue suit. He is a longtime friend of Fox. He serves as the inventor and mechanic of the team. He attended Cornerian Academy, specializing in engineering. Slippy's father Beltino serves as the director of Engineering at Space Dynamics Co. Ltd., and later serves the research director for the Cornerian Defense Forces. Slippy invents and constructs many inventions for the team, including the Blue-Marine, the Landmaster and the Roadmaster. After the Aparoid race is destroyed in Star Fox: Assault, he temporarily withdraws from the Star Fox team. However, when Fox needs backup in Star Fox Command, he comes to his assistance. He is engaged to a frog named Amanda, and in two endings in Star Fox Command they have children together. Slippy Toad tends to fall prey to enemy pilots, and as such calls upon the player for assistance. In both Star Fox 64 and Star Fox: Assault, the player needs to save Slippy early on.

In the SNES game and Nintendo Power comic, Slippy has a croaking stutter, which was removed in later appearances.

Slippy makes a cameo appearance in Super Smash Bros. Brawl as one of Solid Snake's contacts on his Codec and sometimes a contact for Fox, Falco, or Wolf with a taunt on the Star Fox battlefield.

He is voiced in English by Chris Seavor in Super Smash Bros. Melee and Star Fox Adventures and Mike McAuliffe in Star Fox: Assault. He is voiced by Kyoko Tongu in the early Japanese versions of the series; Star Fox 64 3D and Star Fox Zero saw him being voiced by Kei Hayami.

Peppy Hare

 is a rabbit who wears a red suit and is a member of the original Star Fox team, with leader James McCloud and wingmate Pigma Dengar. After Pigma's betrayal and James' capture, Peppy barely escapes to return to Papetoon to inform Fox McCloud of his father's fate. Peppy serves as Fox's mentor and gives Fox instructions and advice throughout the course of the games. Peppy's phrase from Star Fox 64, "Do a barrel roll!", has become an internet meme. Google created an Easter egg homage to it in November 2011. Typing "do a barrel roll" or "z or r twice" makes the user's web browser appear to spin. Cuthbert stated that he named Peppy.

According to Star Fox Command, he has a daughter named Lucy and is the widower of his wife Vivian. By the time of Star Fox: Assault, he is retired from flight duty, taking up an advisory position in the Great Fox. Also according to Command, he is eventually made general of the Corneria Army after Pepper grows ill.

In the Nintendo Power comic, Peppy appears to have some form of extrasensory perception, although it is not elaborated upon.

In English, Peppy was voiced by Rick May in Star Fox 64, Chris Seavor in Super Smash Bros. Melee and Star Fox Adventures, Henry Dardenne in Assault, and Jaz Adams in Star Fox 64 3D and Star Fox Zero. He was originally voiced by Tomohisa Asō in the Japanese versions of the series; Starting with Star Fox 64 3D, Kunpei Sakamoto took the rein of the character.

Krystal
 is a blue fox who is the sole survivor of her doomed home planet, Cerinia. Krystal is calm and kind hearted. She first appears in the series in the early concept Dinosaur Planet and then Star Fox Adventures, where she searches for answers on her planet's destruction and the death of her parents. She comes across a distress signal from Sauria. She joins Star Fox as the team's telepath after the adventure. She fights in multiple battles in Star Fox: Assault. Before the start of Star Fox Command, Krystal leaves the Star Fox team after a strained relationship with Fox. Several possible endings show her returning to both, including one where she marries Fox and their son Marcus leads a new Star Fox team decades in the future. In Star Fox: Assault, Krystal wears a blue catsuit, blue knee-high boots, a silver chain belt, two silver rings on her tail, white beads in her hair, and a silver diadem which has a turquoise jewel.

Krystal wore a loincloth and was originally designed to be a main character of Dinosaur Planet, before Nintendo turned the project into a Star Fox title. Her original design was that of a 16-year-old, who was raised by a wizard named Randorn. When Fox became the main character of Star Fox Adventures, Krystal was redesigned into a 19-year-old and her role in the game became less central.

She makes a cameo appearance starting in Super Smash Bros. Brawl as one of the contacts for Fox, Falco, or Wolf with a taunt on the Lylat Cruise stage. She appears as an Assist Trophy in Super Smash Bros. Ultimate.

In English versions of the series, Krystal speaks Estuary English and is voiced by Estelle Ellis in Star Fox Adventures, and by Alésia Glidewell in Star Fox: Assault, Super Smash Bros. Brawl and Super Smash Bros. Ultimate. In the Japanese version of Assault, Krystal is voiced by Aya Hara.

Other members
In Star Fox 2, completed in 1995 but officially released in 2017, the characters  a female lynx in a red suit, and  a female dog in a blue suit, were added to the Star Fox team; neither of them were featured in games released after the making of Star Fox 2. Dylan Cuthbert stated that he gave Miyu that name because he liked how it sounded, and that he named Fay after a crush he had in childhood prior to his teenage years. Cuthbert stated he did not remember whether he gave family names to Miyu and Fay.

The Nintendo Power's Star Fox comic by Benimaru Itoh exclusively introduced the character Fara Phoenix, a Fennec fox, as a love interest for Fox, starting off as a Cornerian test pilot and later becoming an unofficial member.

ROB 64
ROB's name may be a reference to the NES accessory R.O.B. The 64 is derived from the console of his first appearance, the Nintendo 64. ROB's Japanese name, "NUS", stands for "Nintendo Ultra Sixty-four", the original name of the Nintendo 64 system, and is part of the serial number of all N64 components: the controller, for example, is NUS-005.

ROB has the ability to completely control the Great Fox, piloting it, providing information to the team, and aiding them with items and vehicles. Prior to Star Fox Adventures, he has been rebuilt and upgraded several times by Slippy Toad, infusing him with more productivity and personality. After the first Great Fox is destroyed in Star Fox: Assault, he returns in Star Fox Command piloting the new version of the Great Fox. On some paths in the game, ROB joins Star Wolf when no "hero" character is available.

In Star Fox Zero, a tethered robot similar in appearance, Direct-i, also assists in operation of the Gyrowing and Roadmaster.

ROB is voiced in English by John Silke in Star Fox Adventures and Dex Manley in Star Fox: Assault. He is voiced by Daisuke Sakaguchi in the Japanese version of Star Fox 64, Yusuke Numata in Star Fox: Assault and Atsushi Abe in Star Fox 64 3D.

Prince Tricky

 is the young Centrosaurus prince of the EarthWalker Tribe from the planet Sauria. He serves as Fox's companion in Star Fox Adventures, in which Tricky performs various tasks for Fox, such as digging or breathing fire. He is made an honorary Star Fox member at the end of Adventures. In his second appearance in Star Fox: Assault, Tricky has matured, and is now the king of the EarthWalker Tribe. After Fox and Krystal save his kingdom from the Aparoids, he promises to help repair Sauria.

He was voiced by Kevin Bayliss in Star Fox Adventures and Chet Morgan in Star Fox: Assault. In the Japanese version of Star Fox: Assault, he is voiced by Hirohiko Kakegawa, who also voiced Beltino and James McCloud in the same game. Tricky also cameos in Super Smash Bros. Brawl as a collectible trophy.

Tricky was originally intended to be the same character as "Tricky the Triceratops" in Diddy Kong Racing. Nintendo now owns the rights to the Tricky character.

Star Wolf
 is a group of mercenaries originally hired by Andross to eliminate the Star Fox team. They have since been working on their own as Star Fox's rival team, occasionally helping Star Fox in Star Fox: Assault. Their primary aircraft is the Wolfen. Though Star Wolf were planned to appear on the canceled Star Fox 2, they first appeared in Star Fox 64. They have appeared in every game except for the original Star Fox and Star Fox Adventures. In Star Fox 64 and Star Fox Zero, the team is composed of Wolf O'Donnell, Leon Powalski, ex-Star Fox team member Pigma Dengar, and Andross' nephew Andrew Oikonny, while in Star Fox: Assault and Star Fox Command, the team is composed of Wolf O'Donnell, Leon Powalski, and Panther Caroso.

Wolf O'Donnell

 (sometimes called Lord O'Donnell) is a wolf, the leader of Star Wolf team, and Fox's rival. Wolf's team is initially hired by Andross to take down the Star Fox team. After the Star Wolf team fails their mission, Wolf seeks revenge for personal reasons.

In the English games, Wolf is voiced by Grant Goodeve in Star Fox: Assault and by Jay Ward in Super Smash Bros. Brawl, Starlink: Battle for Atlas, and Super Smash Bros. Ultimate. In the Japanese versions, Wolf is voiced by Hisao Egawa in Star Fox 64, Mahito Oba in Star Fox: Assault and Super Smash Bros. Brawl, and Kosuke Takaguchi in Star Fox 64 3D, Star Fox Zero, Starlink: Battle for Atlas and Super Smash Bros. Ultimate.

Leon Powalski
 is a chameleon who is a member of the Star Wolf team, and is the only member other than Wolf that has been on the team since its creation. Leon's past is unknown, but he most likely had some past rivalry with Falco Lombardi whom he mainly concentrates on during dogfights in Star Fox 64 and taunts mercilessly within Star Fox: Assault.

Leon's personality has changed noticeably since Star Fox 64. He has gone from a classy, competent pilot to a crazed, ruthless assassin who usually gives a deranged laugh after defeating a foe. His voice has also changed to suit this; originally, his tone was calm and sinister, but it has become high-pitched and maniacal.

Despite his ruthless swagger and love of the hunt, Leon loves to adorn his maniacal disposition to maintain his spot as the assassin on the Star Wolf team. He is somewhat of a narcissist, and enjoys his feared reputation.

His personality in Star Fox Command seems to contradict his cold-blooded image. It is implied that, beneath his facade, he has a soft spot for peace. This is hinted at in his profile in the Pilot Gallery and his rejoicing after defeating the Anglar Emperor because he claims that he will look forward to parades with flowers and other such niceties. Leon has a customized ship called the Rainbow Delta, which may allude to his supposed soft spot or reference the fact that chameleons can change color.

Leon has been voiced by Shinobu Satouchi in most of the Japanese versions and by Takashi Ohara in Star Fox 64 3D and Star Fox Zero. In Star Fox: Assault, he and Panther Caroso were voiced in English by David Scully.

In Star Fox: Assault, Leon and Panther Caroso were voiced in English by David Scully. The former has been voiced by Shinobu Satouchi in most of the Japanese versions and by Takashi Ohara in Star Fox 64 3D and Star Fox Zero.

Pigma Dengar
 is a pig who was one of the original members of the Star Fox team. In a private communication, Andross offers Pigma more money to side with him. After Pigma betrays the Star Fox team causing the presumed death of James McCloud, he joins Star Wolf. He is a greedy pirate and does not care who he hurts so long as he is paid. Pigma is also sadistic as evidenced by his introductory quote from the Bolse level. When fighting Star Fox in Star Fox 64, Pigma targets Peppy due to their previously having been teammates. Pigma is later forcibly fired from Star Wolf by Wolf O'Donnell for his greed and treachery.

Pigma attempts to profit off a Memory Cube in Star Fox: Assault. As a result of his greed, he undergoes Aparoid assimilation which fuses him with a spacecraft. Fox McCloud defeats him, causing him to explode.

He serves as a boss in Star Fox Command, revealing that he survived the previous encounter as a cube-shaped cyborg. Whether the player encounters him depends on decisions made during gameplay.

According to Star Fox Zero, Pigma Dengar managed to volunteer as a member of Star Fox shortly before betraying the team. In Star Fox Guard, he is shown to have some degree of mechanical expertise.

In the English version of Star Fox: Assault, Pigma is voiced by Lev Liberman. He was voiced by Daisuke Gōri in the early Japanese versions, and Tsuguo Mogami in the Japanese version of Star Fox 64 3D, Star Fox Zero and Star Fox Guard.

In the Japanese version of Star Fox 64, Pigma speaks in the Kansai dialect. His last name refers to the way people who speak in Kansai often end their sentences with "dengar". The name, "Pigma", is a spin on the word dogma, pointing to his antidogmatic nature.

Andrew Oikonny
 is a monkey who is the nephew of Andross. In Star Fox 64, he is an inexperienced pilot who flies for Star Wolf; he primarily targets Slippy usually saying, "Stick to the pond, froggie". Sometime after Andross is destroyed, Oikonny plans to avenge his uncle's death and is kicked out of Star Wolf.

According to the Official Star Fox 64 Player's Guide his favorite book is "The Apes of Wrath".

In Star Fox: Assault, Oikonny assumes Andross' leadership and forms a rebellion against the Corneria Army. Oikonny pilots his ship resembling Andross, but a large Aparoid destroys it.

He returns in Star Fox Command where he joins the Anglars and pilots the Death Crab. He again attempts to get revenge on Fox and confronts him and his team in Fichina.

In Star Fox 2, a similar character named Algy appears as a member of the Star Wolf wing, who seems to be a lemur and is unrelated to Andross.

In English, he is voiced by John Hugil in Star Fox: Assault. In the Japanese versions of the series, he is voiced by Daisuke Sakaguchi in Star Fox 64, Yūsuke Numata in Star Fox: Assault, and Atsushi Abe in Star Fox 64 3D and Star Fox Zero.

Panther Caroso

His signature symbol, which is on his Wolfen, is a red rose. Panther is conceited and a flirt, considering himself a ladies' man. In the game, he unsuccessfully tries to flirt with Krystal several times.

Panther reappears in Star Fox Command, where he attempts to begin a relationship with Krystal after she joins the Star Wolf team following her breakup with Fox. In the English version of Command, Panther speaks in the third person, despite his normal speaking habits in Star Fox: Assault.

He is voiced in English by David Scully in Star Fox: Assault. His Japanese voice is provided by Tetsu Inada in both Star Fox: Assault and Super Smash Bros. Brawl.

Other villains

Andross's Army
 (also known as the ) is the main army of the planet Venom, which operates under Andross. Although most of the army is decimated by the Star Fox team and the Corneria Army, a small group of them are present for the Aparoid invasion.

Andross

Before the series, Andross was a scientist working for Corneria. His original intentions are supposedly pure and beneficial; he devotes most of his life to finding ways to protect Corneria. However, a growing obsession with his engine and bio-technology drives him to the brink of madness, despite multiple warnings from the planet's ruling council. The increasing perversion of his experiments results in unleashing a deadly weapon within a Cornerian city, which may or may not have been accidental.

Subsequently captured by General Pepper and banished for treason to the wasteland planet Venom, he builds an army and plots to dominate the Lylat System and rebuild it in his name. The original Star Fox team is sent to investigate. The investigation ends when Pigma Dengar defects to Andross's side and sends his friends to Andross, resulting in the capture (and possible death) of James McCloud. Andross then proclaims himself emperor of the Lylat System, and begins to invade the neighboring worlds, initiating the Lylat Wars.

Five years later after a new Star Fox team is formed under Fox McCloud, they begin their mission to liberate the Lylat System from Andross. Upon arriving at Venom, Fox engages Andross in a duel. Andross is shown to have apparently experimented with himself and become a giant disembodied head, but Fox is able to defeat him and Andross self-destructs.

Andross' spirit survives. After a botched attempt at a revival on Titania, Andross travels to Sauria (also known as Dinosaur Planet). Weakened, Andross takes refuge in Krazoa Palace, and uses the SharpClaw Tribe to keep him alive. He manipulates their leader General Scales into collecting various artifacts infused with the spirits of the Krazoa and imprisons Krystal in the palace. Through her, he is able to generate the energy from the Krazoa Spirits to restore himself back to full power, intending to obliterate the entire Lylat System. Fox again defeats him, after which Andross again self-destructs.

While he does not appear in Star Fox: Assault, his reign continues in his nephew Andrew Oikonny, who constructs a new fleet with Andross' remaining Venomian units. They attack Fortuna at the beginning of the game, with Andrew using a robotic copy of his uncle as the game's first boss.

He reappears in Star Fox Command as a spirit in control of a bio-weapon, but is no longer a threat.

Dialogue between Zazan and the Anglar Emperor in "Fox and Krystal" implies that the Anglar race was created by Andross.

Andross appears in Super Smash Bros. Brawl as an Assist Trophy character, resembling his metallic-looking form from the first Star Fox game.

According to Star Fox Zero, Andross secretly worked on a Cornerian teleportation device for peacekeeping purposes, but his lust for power made him claim it as his own for his schemes. After discovering the truth, General Pepper and James McCloud used the teleporter to exile Andross to another dimension.

In Star Fox 2, a direct sequel to the original game, Andross is revealed to have survived his encounter with Fox McCloud and his army advances towards Corneria. The Star Fox team hastily scrambles to destroy Andross once again.

Andross appears in several different forms throughout the Star Fox series:
 In the first game, he takes the form of a large metallic head (or possibly a hologram) that contains a cube covered in images of his face.
 In Star Fox 64 and Star Fox Adventures, the shell is a large version of his head, which contains an enlarged brain that can act and move independently. The latter Andross is more demonic-looking than the other, resembling a large gorilla head. In Star Fox: Assault, his nephew Andrew uses a robot with a similar design.
 In Star Fox Zero, Andross is first shown in a form that outwardly resembles his appearance in Star Fox 64, but he is shown to have become robotic.
 In Star Fox 2, his image appears as a disheveled version of his previous self with a cybernetic implant over the left side of his head, and his boss form initially appears as a mask and later a form somewhat resembling his Star Fox 64 self.

Andross was voiced by Rick May in the English version of Star Fox 64. He was also voiced by Daisuke Gōri in the Japanese version of Star Fox 64 and by Tsuguo Mogami in Star Fox 64 3D and Star Fox Zero.

Captain Shears
 is a dog who appears in the manga Star Fox: Farewell, Beloved Falco, which was released on the official Star Fox Adventures Japanese website. Shears conducts his operations in a base on Titania. Working as a double agent, he tells the Star Fox team he and his group of scientists are planning to reconstruct Andross's research, claiming there might still be Venom soldiers on the planet. Katt Monroe does not trust him and tells Falco of Shears' plan, leading to a dogfight between Fox and Falco. While Fox prevails, Falco is unharmed.

The Star Fox team and Katt's gang team up and learn Shears is not planning to reconstruct Andross' research, but to resurrect Andross. Fox storms into Shears' base and fights him. After losing, Shears attempts to escape, only to be crushed under the weight of the newly constructed Andross. He is never seen again.

General Scales
 appears in Star Fox Adventures. Scales leads the SharpClaw Tribe, which strives to be the ruling tribe of Sauria. After being rejected by the other tribes, General Scales amasses an army of Sharpclaws and breaks four pieces of the planet apart by removing the four SpellStones where his army occupies each chunk. Andross gives him power in return for capturing Krystal and the Krazoa Spirits, while keeping himself relatively unknown to Scales at the same time. At the end of the game, Andross stops the fight between Scales and Fox and has him relinquish the last Krazoa spirit to Fox and collapses. Before he relinquishes the Krazoa Spirit, General Scales tells Fox that he will regret this.

General Scales is voiced by John Silke.

Aparoid Queen
The  is the leader of the Aparoid race and the primary antagonist of Star Fox: Assault. From within the Homeworld, the Queen rules over the Aparoids like a queen bee over her hive. Beltino Toad determines that if the Queen is infected with a self-destruct program, then the rest of the Aparoids will die along with her. She can emulate personalities of people who are infected, or people close to her enemies. Star Fox make their way into the Queen's chamber, and infect her with the self-destruct program. The rest of the Aparoids are wiped out. She seems to take a peaceful approach when directly confronted, as she attempts to convince the Star Fox team to give in. She describes the assimilation as "not sacrifice, but evolution". She also believes that everything in the universe exists for the Aparoids (or herself).

Anglar Army
The  are a race of anglerfish-like creatures that reside in the Toxic Seas of Venom. They first appear Star Fox Command. It is implied in the Venom Level of the storyline "Fox and Krystal" that the Anglar were accidentally created by Andross through mutations caused by his experiments on Venom's oceans.

Anglar Emperor
The  is the leader of the Anglar race, and the primary antagonist of Star Fox Command. Originating on Venom, he appears as a final boss for several missions. He pilots a large serpent-like creature known as the Arrowhead. In some of the final missions, he becomes a very large angler fish, capable of taking the player's ship into his mouth, which is reminiscent of an attack used by Andross in other games.

Octoman
, an octopus-like creature, is one of the Anglar Emperor's henchmen.

He is based on Octoman from the F-Zero franchise.

Zako
Zako is a hammerhead shark-like bounty hunter. He is defeated in the Venom Sea.

Zazan
 is an Anglar who led the attack on Corneria. He is defeated during the fight on Venom.

Zoldge
 is a squid-like mercenary that pilots the Solar Satellite. He is defeated when the Solar Satellite is shot down.

Supporting characters

General Pepper
 is the bloodhound Commander-in-chief of the Corneria Defense Force.

He originally exiles Andross to Venom and hires the Star Fox team to investigate it five years later. Five more years later, he becomes the primary source for the new Star Fox's missions. Pepper assigned Star Fox to investigate Dinosaur Planet (Sauria) in Star Fox Adventures.

During the Aparoid invasion in Star Fox: Assault, Pepper comes close to death when Aparoids fuse to him and his flagship. At the General's command, Fox destroys the ship with Pepper still on board. He is rescued by Peppy Hare.

Afterwards, Pepper grows ill and retires his position as general of the Corneria Army. He passes this role on to his friend Peppy Hare prior to the events of Star Fox Command.

In English, he is voiced by John Silke in Star Fox Adventures and Gray Eubank in Assault. In the Japanese version of Star Fox 64, he was voiced by Daisuke Gōri, Michihiro Ikemizu in Star Fox: Assault, and currently by Tsuguo Mogami in Star Fox 64 3D and Star Fox Zero.

James McCloud
 is Fox's father and the principal founder of the Star Fox team. On a scouting mission to Venom, he was betrayed by a former member of Star Fox named Pigma Dengar and the team is captured by the evil Andross. In the ensuing conflict, James McCloud courageously creates a diversion so that Peppy Hare could escape, presumably sacrificing himself (though his true fate is ambiguous). He appears to Fox McCloud in Star Fox 64 to lead Fox out of Andross's exploding base and in Star Fox Command during a final boss fight.

James makes his first playable appearance in Command piloting an Arwing like Peppy which resembles the Assault design. None of the other characters acknowledge him and Fox questions if he is seeing things.

He also appears in Star Fox Zero, where Andross acknowledges him by loudly asking why he won't stay dead.

In the Star Fox for SNES, it is stated that Fox's father is missing and was last seen at a black hole. However, the Black Hole is actually a warp point that was created by Andross' experiments. In the Nintendo Power comic, he is given the name Fox McCloud Sr.

In Star Fox: Assault, the Aparoid Queen uses James' voice, hinting that James may have been infected at one point. It is also possible that the Aparoid Queen learned of James through the memories of those the Aparoids had infected.

James is also the name of a character in the F-Zero series. The instruction booklet for F-Zero X describes him as working to raise money for the debts of his mercenary organization, "Galaxy Dog". He also uses a racing car similar to an Arwing.

James was voiced by Tomohisa Asō in Star Fox 64, and by Hirohiko Kakegawa in Star Fox: Assault. In Star Fox 64 3D, James is voiced by Kunpei Sakamoto.

Katt Monroe
 is a lone fighter who comes to the aid of the Corneria Defense Force and the Star Fox team. Katt resembles a cat, and appears with pink fur in Star Fox 64 and Star Fox Zero, but appears in Star Fox Command with black fur.

She appears in Star Fox 64 on the planet Zoness, and will either appear to defend the Great Fox in Sector Z, or shoot switches on Macbeth. She has a crush on Falco Lombardi, wishing to join Star Fox to be close to him. In Star Fox Command, she appears in missions with Falco in the Asteroid Belt and Sector X. She and Falco have an argument in which Falco insults her and Katt vows to never help him again, though later in the storyline, she does say she "can't just sit and watch him from the sidelines".

In the manga, "Farewell, Beloved Falco", Katt appears to have a romantic relationship with another cat with blue fur whose name is unknown. Though she implies she likes him, she still shows a liking for Falco.

Katt is voiced by Kyōko Tongū in the Japanese version of Star Fox 64, and Kei Hayami in the Japanese version of Star Fox 64 3D and Star Fox Zero.

Dinosaur Tribes
There are various Dinosaur Tribes that live on Sauria as seen in Star Fox Adventures:

 The CloudRunners - The CloudRunners are one of the two ruling tribes on Sauria. They resemble Pteranodons.
 The EarthWalkers - The EarthWalkers are one of the two ruling tribes on Sauria. They resemble various Ceratopsid genera.
 The HighTops - The HighTops are the largest dinosaur tribe on Sauria. They are based on the Apatosaurus and other Sauropods.
 The LightFoots - The LightFoots are a secretive and reclusive tribe on Sauria. They are loosely based on the Ornitholestes and the Chief LightFoot has a frill similar to that of a frilled lizard and the Jurassic Park version of the Dilophosaurus. They live in the LightFoot Village between ThornTail Hollow and Cape Claw. The LightFoots do not interact with other Tribes.
 The RedEyes - The RedEyes are a tribe of carnivorous dinosaurs that are locked up in the Walled City on Sauria by the EarthWalkers. They are based on the Tyrannosaurus. The RedEyes are released from the Walled City by General Scales.
 The ShadowHunters - The ShadowHunters are a tribe of dinosaurs that are mostly seen in the Test of Fear. They evoke the appearances of the Velociraptor and Coelophysis.
 The SharpClaws - The SharpClaws are a race of humanoid Allosaurus that are more advanced and violent than the other tribes. The SharpClaw originated from a fragment of the second moon of Sauria which crashed into the planet and became known as the Moon Mountain Pass. Eventually, they left their home and spread.
 The BribeClaws - SharpClaw soldiers that can be bribed into letting Fox McCloud pass if he pays them 20 scarabs.
 The SnowHorns - The SnowHorns are a race of Woolly Mammoths that reside in the SnowHorn Wastes.
 The ThornTails - The ThornTails are a peaceful tribe of dinosaurs that live in ThornTail Hollow on Sauria. They are based on the Nodosaurus.

When the Aparoids invaded Sauria during Star Fox: Assault, some of the Dinosaur Tribes lost some of their members to the battle.

Beltino Toad
 is Slippy Toad's father. He works as the research director for the Corneria Defense Force. Beltino originally worked for Space Dynamics Co. Ltd. as an engineer. He and Slippy construct many inventions for the Star Fox team, including the Blue-Marine and the Landmaster. Beltino is first mentioned in the Star Fox 64 Player's Guide, but does not make an in-game appearance until Star Fox: Assault. Beltino discovers the way to defeat the Aparoids. Star Fox destroys them using a program he developed. In the English version of Assault, Beltino Toad is voiced by Scott Burns, and his Japanese voice actor is Hirohiko Kakegawa.

Amanda Toad
 is Slippy's fiancée, who first appears in Star Fox Command. They meet two years prior to the events of Star Fox Command, and instantly fall in love. Amanda occasionally helps the team out. She pilots the  a ship armed with a multi-lock. She considers herself more of the leader in her relationship with Slippy, and always wants to be on his side during a fight. In two endings, she and Slippy settle down with children, one of whom joins Fox and Krystal's son, Marcus, as well as Lucy Hare's daughter and Falco Lombardi himself in forming a new Star Fox team. In another ending, she herself joins the Star Fox team to be close to Slippy.

Corneria Army
Their purpose is to protect Corneria and all of the Lylat System from all types of threats. Besides General Pepper, Captain Shears, and the generic soldiers, among the members of the Corneria Army are:

Bill Grey
 is a dog who is Fox's friend and appears to help him in Star Fox 64, Star Fox Command and Star Fox Zero. The two were originally in training together in the Cornerian Academy, and after Fox leaves to join Star Fox, Bill rises through the ranks and is elected commander of the Husky and Bulldog squadrons of Corneria. In his first two games, he assists Fox when Star Fox reaches Katina. The name of the character is a reference to General William Grey, from the 1996 blockbuster film Independence Day. The battle on Katina in Star Fox 64 also greatly resembles Independence Day. Bill is voiced by Daisuke Sakaguchi in the Japanese version of Star Fox 64, and Atsushi Abe in the Japanese version of Star Fox 64 3D and Star Fox Zero.

Dash Bowman
He thinks very highly of Fox and Falco, and wishes to join the Star Fox team. He makes his first appearance in Star Fox Command. Despite his grandfather's dark ways, he still appreciates the man's forgotten aspirations, and wishes to carry on his legacy of making Lylat a better place. Dash's future remains uncertain. One ending shows him joining Falco and Katt to form the Star Falco team, while another two show him becoming ruler of Venom. One of the latter shows him converting Venom into a peaceful planet and the other has him becoming corrupt with power like Andross.

Lucy Hare
 is a rabbit who debuts in Star Fox Command, and is Peppy Hare's only daughter. Her mother  died shortly after the Lylat Wars due to an illness. She is a bit of a tomboy, but is still very polite to her elders. She is an astrophysics teacher on the planet Fichina, but wants to become a pilot like her father. She and Krystal are good friends. In some missions, she fights the Anglar attackers in her aircraft, the  armed with plasma lasers and a single lock. In one of the endings, her daughter becomes a member of the new Star Fox team, led by Marcus, Fox's son.

Reception
When reviewing Star Fox Adventures, GameSpot reviewer Greg Kasavin commented that the game has a likable cast of characters who manage to be cute and pretty cool at the same time.

Notes

References

Star Fox characters
Star Fox
Anthropomorphic video game characters
Star Fox